SS Arratoon Apcar was an iron-hulled steamship built in 1861 for the Apcar Line. She ran ashore on Fowey Rocks off the coast of Florida on 17 February 1878, was abandoned 3 days later, and broke apart. Today the wreck is a good location for scuba diving.

Construction and service

SS Arratoon Apcar was built in Renfrew, Scotland by James Henderson and Son.
The ship was powered by a 250 hp steam engine, with an iron hull.
She was launched on 27 June 1861.
She was named after the founder of Apcar and Company of Bombay, India, for whom she was built.
In 1872 the Apcar family purchased a considerably larger ship that they also called Arratoon Apcar, selling the older ship to H.F. Swan Company.

Wreck

SS Arratoon Apcar was en route from Havana, Cuba to Liverpool, England when she ran aground on 17 February 1878 on Fowey Rocks,
due to a miscalculation by Captain Pottinger.
The reef had already claimed other ships.
Several workmen were camped on a platform on the new screw pilings of the Fowey Rocks Light that they were building on the rocks.

The crew of the ship spent three days trying to pump her out before abandoning her and heading for the shore in their lifeboats.
The captain and his complete crew of 24 men were picked up by the Tappahannock.
Foul weather pushed the ship onto the reef, pounding her on the rocks.
The ship broke up and was a total loss by 12 March 1878.

Mistaken identity

The wreck now tentatively identified as the Arratoon Apcar was known for many years as the Arakanapka, and is so called in books and on various dive-related web sites.

Today

The lower hull and irons beams of the ship are still visible, encrusted with coral, and there are some remains of other parts of the ship.
There are many fish, and with shallow water the location provides an excellent site for snorkeling or diving.
However, the shallow waters near the reef may create strong surges that could damage a boat.
The Arratoon Apcar is one of five historic wrecks in the Biscayne National Park "Shipwreck Trail".

References
Citations

Sources

Ships built on the River Clyde
1861 ships
Shipwrecks of the Florida coast
Wreck diving sites in the United States
Biscayne National Park
Maritime incidents in February 1878